was a Shinto shrine located in the former Takao City (now Kaohsiung), Takao Prefecture, Taiwan during the Japanese rule period. The shrine enshrined Prince Yoshihisa, Ōmononushi no Mikoto (大物主命), and Emperor Sutoku.

History
It was renamed Takao Shrine in 1920 and moved to the hillside in 1928. In 1932, the shrine received the kensha (県社) rank.

After 1945, the government of Republic of China transformed the Shinto shrine into the Kaohsiung Martyrs' Shrine (高雄市忠烈祠 Gāoxióng shì zhōngliècí). Most of the Japanese structures were demolished in the 1970s and rebuilt as a Chinese temple.

See also
 History of Kaohsiung
 Kaohsiung Martyrs' Shrine

References

1912 establishments in Taiwan
Shinto shrines in Taiwan
Religious buildings and structures in Kaohsiung
20th-century Shinto shrines